Luis Alberto Amezcua Balboa (born 10 May 1992 in Guadix) is a Spanish racewalker.

Competition record

References

External links
 

Living people
1992 births
Sportspeople from the Province of Granada
Spanish male racewalkers
World Athletics Championships athletes for Spain
Spanish Athletics Championships winners